Jean Edith Clark (26 September 1936 – 25 November 1970) is an English former cricketer who played primarily as a bowler. She appeared in one Test match for England, against Australia in 1968. She played domestic cricket for Kent.

References

External links
 
 

1936 births
1970 deaths
England women Test cricketers
Kent women cricketers